Zachary "Zach" Craig Lutz (born June 3, 1986) is an American former professional baseball third baseman. He previously played in Major League Baseball (MLB) for the New York Mets, the Tohoku Rakuten Golden Eagles of Nippon Professional Baseball and the Doosan Bears of the Korea Baseball Organization.

Early life
Lutz was born on June 3, 1986 in Reading, Pennsylvania. He attended Governor Mifflin Senior High School in Shillington, Pennsylvania, then Alvernia University in Reading, where his father Yogi was the baseball coach. Zach played third base for the Alvernia Crusaders of the Division III Pennsylvania Athletic Conference (now known as the Colonial States Athletic Conference). He earned preseason All-American honors prior to his 2007 junior year.

Professional career

New York Mets
In the 2007 Major League Baseball draft, Lutz was chosen in the 5th round by the New York Mets, and subsequently spent time in the Mets minor league system.

In the 2010 baseball season, Lutz played for the Binghamton Mets and Buffalo Bisons, the Mets' Double-A and Triple-A affiliates, despite missing around sixty days due to a stress fracture in his left foot. In 61 games for Binghamton, Lutz hit 17 home runs, finishing with a .967 OPS. At the end of the season, Lutz was promoted to Buffalo where he played five games, finishing with one home run while hitting to a .300 batting average. Prior to the 2011 season, the New York Mets placed Lutz on the 40-man roster to protect him from the Rule 5 draft.

On April 24, 2012, Lutz made his major league debut against the Miami Marlins, striking out in his one at-bat. Lutz got his first major league hit on April 27, 2012, in Denver against the Colorado Rockies. On September 1, 2012, Lutz was recalled by the Mets and then was sent back to Triple-A.

He was again recalled on June 23, 2013, to fill in for Lucas Duda. He joined fellow Alvernia University alum Anthony Recker on the team.

Tohoku Rakuten Golden Eagles
Lutz was released by the Mets on June 11, 2014 so that he could sign with the Tohoku Rakuten Golden Eagles of the Nippon Professional Baseball League.

Second Stint With Mets
Lutz signed a minor league deal with the Mets on July 16, 2015.

Miami Marlins
Lutz signed a minor league deal with the Marlins on February 3, 2016. He was released on June 20, 2016.

Somerset Patriots
Lutz signed with the Somerset Patriots of the Atlantic League of Professional Baseball on March 1, 2017.   He announced his retirement on May 1, 2017.

References

External links

Living people
1986 births
New York Mets players
Alvernia Golden Wolves baseball players
Brooklyn Cyclones players
Binghamton Mets players
St. Lucie Mets players
Gulf Coast Mets players
Buffalo Bisons (minor league) players
Las Vegas 51s players
Sportspeople from Reading, Pennsylvania
Tohoku Rakuten Golden Eagles players
Doosan Bears players
American expatriate baseball players in Japan
American expatriate baseball players in South Korea
New Orleans Zephyrs players
Estrellas Orientales players
American expatriate baseball players in the Dominican Republic
Somerset Patriots players